Miss Ethiopia is a national beauty pageant in Ethiopia.

History
The Miss Ethiopia began in 1963. Later that year Miss Addis Ababa held in 1964 and 1964. There were two editions during the period and it finally rerun as the Miss Ethiopia pageant in 1988 by Ethio American Entertainment Inc. In modern era the Miss Ethiopia pageant owned by Murad Mohammed.

Controversies
Miss Ethiopia chair Murad Mohammed, director of Ethiopian Village Adventure Playground, which claims ownership of Miss Ethiopia, have frequently announced that the Miss Ethiopia queens would participate in international pageants like Miss International, Miss Earth, Miss Progress, etc. despite not owning a franchise for the pageants. Much of the judging is not done publicly, so the general population is not able to follow the process from start to finish, or see the final event taking place. Mohammed has been accused of repeatedly advertising bogus prizes for his version of Miss Ethiopia, such as cash, modeling contracts, cars, and jewelry, none of which can be verified as having ever been awarded.

Melkam Michael Endale, who was crowned Miss Ethiopia 2010, was later appointed Miss World Ethiopia in 2012 without taking part in a contest for the purpose of attending Miss World 2012. She failed to attend the event. She was also listed as Ethiopia's representative to Miss Intercontinental Pageant 2012, but once again did not show.

Lack of transparency
The latest version of the pageant is seen to lack transparency, due to the fact that the winner is suddenly announced without a proper contest being held, girls are put in a studio with sashes proclaiming them to be finalist, but the public are not able to follow the process from start to finish, or see the actual final event taking place.

In several years past the runner up has simply been appointed Miss Ethiopia by Murad Mohammed and Ethiopian Village Adventure Playground for the purpose of attending Miss World for example. Melkam Michael Endale who was crowned Miss Ethiopia 2010 for example, who never got her promised car or 100,000 ETBirr, was simply appointed as Miss World Ethiopia in 2012, without taking part in a contest for the purpose of attending Miss World 2012

Murad Mohammed and Ethiopian Village Adventure Playground has also frequently announced that its Miss Ethiopia queens will participate in international pageants like Miss International 2012, Miss Earth 2012, Miss Progress etc. despite not owning the franchises for the pageants. Melkam Michael Endale who was crowned Miss Ethiopia 2010 for example, was announced as Ethiopia's representative to Miss International 2012 but failed to attend the event.

Bogus prizes
Murad Mohammed, director of Ethiopian Village Adventure Playground which claims to be to latest owner of Miss Ethiopia, has been accused of repeatedly advertising bogus prizes for his version of Miss Ethiopia, such as 100,000 Et Birr, US$6250 prize, a house, Modelling contract in New York, participation in several international pageants, awarding of 60,000 Et birr US$3750 Diamond rings, none of which can be verified as having been ever awarded.

Titleholders

Ethiopia at International pageants

Miss World Ethiopia

Began 2003 the new foundation of Miss World Ethiopia (Ethiopian Beauty Queens Organization) took the franchise of Miss World and the winner represents Ethiopia at Miss World pageant.

Miss International Ethiopia

The second title of Miss World Ethiopia will be Miss International Ethiopia and represents Ethiopia at Miss International pageant.

Miss Supranational Ethiopia

Miss Supranational Ethiopia individually held by Miss Supranational Ethiopia Organization. The winner represents Ethiopia at Miss Supranational pageant.

Miss Grand International Ethiopia

Miss Intercontinental Ethiopia

See also

Miss Universe Ethiopia

References

Beauty pageants in Ethiopia
Recurring events established in 1963
Ethiopian awards

it:Miss Etiopia